Dasari Janaki, known professionally as Dubbing Janaki, is an Indian actress and voice artist. She has appeared in several films and television shows in various South Indian languages.

Early life 
Janaki was born in Peddapuram, East Godavari District, Andhra Pradesh. She started acting in stage shows from the age of 9. She studied up to 7th standard. Though her birthname is Dasari Janaki, she was called Dubbing Janaki by the media to distinguish Janaki from her contemporaries, actress Sowcar Janaki and singer S. Janaki.

She married Ramakrishnan, a military employee, at the age of 15 in 1964 and relocated to Chennai. The couple have two sons and a daughter. Her husband died in 1997. She is currently living with her children family in Chennai.

Career 
She started appearing in films since 1958. Her first film was Bhookailas produced by AVM. She dubbed for the role of Kasturba in the Telugu film Gandhi. She played an important character in the film Sankarabharanam (1980) in which she played a maid. After that, she started getting similar roles. She is also remembered for her mother roles in films Sagara Sangamam (1983) and Swati Kiranam.

Filmography

Telugu
Ashoka Vanamlo Arjuna Kalyanam
20va Shatabdam
Abhishekam
Rendu Rellu Aaru
Aha Naa Pellanta
Amara Deepam
Agni Putrudu
Aashayam
Aadade Aadharam
 Aradhana
Coolie No. 1
Dorikithe Dongalu (1989) as Annapurna
Geethanjali
Indrudu Chandrudu
Jamba Lakidi Pamba
Ugra Narasimham (1986)
Madana Gopaludu (1987)
Ontari Poratam
Rudraveena as Gemini Ganeshan's wife
 Seethakoka chilaka 
Seetamalakshmi
Sankarabharanam
Saptapadi
Swati Mutyam
Swarnakamalam
Sagara Sangamam
Varasudochhadu

Tamil
Pillai Nila 
Jeeva
Idhu Namma Aalu
Rajadhi Raja
Mappillai (1989)
En Purushanthaan Enakku Mattumthaan (1989)
Manaivi Oru Manickam (1990)
Avasara Police 100
Marupadiyum (1993)
Gokulam (1993)
Enga Mudhalali (1993)
Pasumpon (1995)
Periya Kudumbam (1995)
Karuppu Roja (1996)
Puthimai Pithan (1998)
Simmasanam (2000)
Pottu Amman (2000)
Panchatantiram (2002)
Ghajinikanth (2018)

Kannada
 Mane Mane Kathe (1981)
 Hosa Belaku (1982)
 Haalu Jenu (1982)
  Adrushtavantha (1982)
  Pooja Phala (1984)
 Shravana Banthu (1984)
 Apoorva Sangama (1984)
 Sathi Sakkubayi (1985)
 Prema Kadambhari (1987)
 Shivashankar (1990)
 Bevu Bella (1993)
 Rayaru Bandaru Mavana Manege(1993)
 Lockup Death (1994)
 Gadibidi Aliya (1995)
 Bangarada Kalasha (1995)

Television

References

External links

Indian film actresses
Actresses in Telugu cinema
Living people
1949 births
Actresses from Andhra Pradesh
Actresses in Tamil cinema
Indian television actresses
Actresses in Kannada cinema
Nandi Award winners
20th-century Indian actresses
21st-century Indian actresses
Actresses in Telugu television
Actresses in Tamil television